Fever Dreams (2004) is an album by the American ambient musician Steve Roach. The music consists of bizarre, hallucinatory textures and tribal percussion. The first track, "Wicked Dream", was co-composed with Patrick O'Hearn.

This album is continued with Holding the Space – Fever Dreams II.

Concept
When Roach had arrived home after one of his many extended trips to Australia, he had also caught a rare virus native to the country just before his flight. As a result, Roach underwent a series of hallucinations as internal temperatures rose to heights of 107 °F. After 3 weeks, Roach had made a full recovery.

When asked at a later appearance, Roach stated that "After the fever I couldn't wait to get started on Fever Dreams. It was a very intense experience, and I think now I'll be able to harness that kind of experience into this album." Since the fever, Roach has taken  measures to apply any necessary immunities before any more of his trips.

Track listing
All tracks by Steve Roach except where noted.
"Wicked Dream" (Elton John, Patrick O'Hearn, Roach) – 18:41
"Fever Pulse" – 10:34
"Tantra Mantra" – 29:36
"Moved Beyond" – 14:30

Personnel
Steve Roach – (synthesizers, guitar, percussion, bass)
Patrick O'Hearn – (bass and guitar on "Wicked Dream")
Will Merkle – (bass on "Fever Pulse")
Byron Metcalf – (frame drum and percussion on "Tantra Mantra" and "Moved Beyond")

References

2004 albums
Steve Roach (musician) albums
Projekt Records albums